Packebusch is a village and a former municipality in the district Altmarkkreis Salzwedel, in Saxony-Anhalt, Germany. Since 1 January 2010, it is part of the town Kalbe.

Geography 
Packebusch is an angerdorf alongside a road, with a church located on the central green. It resides in the center of Altmark on the edge of the conservation area Kalbescher Werder bei Vienau, about 20 km (12.4 mi.) south-east of the district capital Salzwedel.

The communities of Packebusch and Hagenau are part of the village.

History 
Packebusch is first mentioned in 1324 as Pokebusch, when Hans and Heinecke of the house Kröcher sold the Kalbe castle and the accompanying villages to Albrecht of the House of Alvensleben. Further mentions are recorded in 1464 as de kerke to Pakebusch, in 1473 as pakebusch, in 1541 as Backepusch, and in 1687 as Packebusch.

Etymology 
Franz Mertens translated an older form of the name, backebusch, into Hochdeutsch Buchenbusch (beech bush). Beech woodland once used to encompass three sides of the village.

Mergers 
On 25 July 1952 Packebusch was transferred from the district of Salzwedel to the now defunct authority of Kries Kalbe (Milde). On 1 July 1994 they were placed into the district of Altmarkkreis Salzwedel.

By the end of 2009 Packebusch, along with Hagengau (incorporated on 1 August 1973) formed an independent municipality. The municipality was a member of the administration partnership Arendsee-Kalbe and their last mayor was Otto Wienecke (* 1959).

As a result of a Gebietsänderungsvereinbarung (an agreement to change territories) the municipal councils of Kalbe (Milde) (on 25 June 2009), Brunau (12 May 2009), Engerson (2 June 2009), Jeetze (3 June 2009), Kakerbeck (25 June 2009), Packebusch (4 June 2009), and Vienau (14 May 2009) agreed to dissolve their municipalities and become entwined with the town of Kalbe (Milde). The application was accepted by the commune oversight committee and came into force on 1 January 2010.

Following the application becoming law, the independent community of Packebusch along with its constituent communities became a part of the new town of Kalbe. In the new municipality and current locality of Packbusch, a council was formed with seven members including the local mayor.

Population Development

Religion 
The evangelical congregation and parish of Packebusch belong to the parish area of Fleetmark-Jeetze, which itself comes under the church district of Salzwedel in Propstsprengel Stendal-Magdeburg, park of the Evangelical Church in Central Germany. In 1903, the communities of Packebusch, Hagenau, and Boock belonged to the congregation.

Culture and Sights

Buildings 

 The protestant church of Packebusch is a stately, late-romanesque fieldstone hall church with a west cross tower from 1900. According to the plans of the district architect Pflughaupt in 1865, in the course of an extensive reconstruction of the church the square choir was demolished, the nave was extended to the east, the entrance was moved from the south to the west side, a polygonal apse was built in, the eaves were raised, a round-arched frieze was added, and a large round-arched window was inserted. In 1972 the church was renovated.
 There are also half-timbered houses in the typical style of the Altmark and old head lime trees in the Dorfstraße. As remnants from the time of clay and loam mining, the remaining holes are now used as a biotope. Around a bathing pond there is a local recreation area with a campground.

Memorials 

 A burial place in the local cemetery exists for a named Polish man, who was deported to Germany during the Second World War and became a victim of forced labour.
 In Packebusch there is a monument in front of the church for the fallen of the First and Second World War.

Economy and Infrastructure

Official Institutions 

 Village community centre of Packebusch

Transport 
The railway station Brunau-Packebusch, located southwest of the village, is on the Stendal-Uelzen railway line. The federal highway 190 is located about 15 kilometers away near Arendsee.

Notable People 

Bernd Sennecke (* 7. Februar 1950), Politician (CDU) and member of the state government for Saxony-Anhalt
Friedrich-Wilhelm Ulrich (* 20. Oktober 1953), Rower, Olympic Champion in 1976 and 1980 with Steuermann
Emil Schnell (* 10. November 1953), last Minister for Post and Telecommunications of the GDR and MdB
Hans-Jörg Krause (* 28. Januar 1954), Politician (Die Linke) and member of the state government for Saxony-Anhalt

References 

Former municipalities in Saxony-Anhalt
Kalbe, Saxony-Anhalt